Eagle Harbor may refer to several places in the United States:

 Eagle Harbor, a development on Fleming Island, Florida
 Eagle Harbor, Maryland, a town
 Eagle Harbor, Michigan, an unincorporated community and census-designated place
 Eagle Harbor Coast Guard Station Boathouse, a historic building
 Eagle Harbor Light, a lighthouse
 Eagle Harbor Schoolhouse, a historic building
 Eagle Harbor Township, Michigan
 Eagle Harbor, New York, a hamlet
 Eagle Harbor (Washington), an inlet in Bainbridge Island
 Eagle Harbor High School
 Eagle Harbor (Wisconsin), a small harbor in Door County